"The High School Cadets" is a march written in 1890 by John Philip Sousa in honor of the cadet drill team of Washington High School in the District of Columbia. It is in regimental march form (I-AA-BB-CC-DD) and is a popular selection for school concert and marching bands, as well as for professional orchestras and bands. The march has been arranged for a wide variety of instruments and ensembles, and has been frequently recorded, including at least two recorded performances by Sousa's own band. The march's final strains were featured in the 1939 film The Under-Pup.

History
In 1888, John Philip Sousa composed The March Past of the National Fencibles, in honor of a renowned militia drill team affiliated with the National Guard of the District of Columbia. In 1890, the rival drill team of the Washington High School (subsequently Washington Central) asked Sousa, a native of the District, to compose a march for them, and he obliged with The High School Cadets March, now generally known simply as High School Cadets.  
High School Cadets quickly became one of Sousa's most popular marches. Just four years after its composition, the Nebraska State Journal listed it as one of the composer's "most notable" marches, along with Washington Post March, Liberty Bell March, and several others. It was recorded by Sousa's Grand Concert Band around 1899 and has been frequently recorded ever since (see Recordings).

The march was published in 1890 by Philadelphia music publisher Harry Coleman in arrangements for band, for piano solo and for several other small instrumental ensembles.(see Arrangements.) Subsequently the copyright was picked up by Carl Fischer Music of New York, which continues to list the march in its catalog, both in the original form and in a modern arrangement. The copyright on the original score was renewed by Sousa in 1918; it has now expired and the work is in the public domain in the United States.

High School Cadets continues to be frequently performed, both by professional ensembles and by amateur and school bands. (See External links.)

Musical structure & instrumentation
High School Cadets is in the form of a regimental march, consisting of four repeated musical strains with a short introduction: I-AA-BB-CC-DD. An alternate form plays all four strains without repeats, and then recapitulates the whole march (minus the introduction): I-ABCD-ABCD. This variant is popular with marching bands and was also used by the Edison Military Band in their 1907 recording. (see Recordings) 
 

Each strain is 16 bars in length except the A strain, which is 24 bars long. The A theme, in D-flat major, is "an energetic, somewhat jaunty creation, punctuated by crescendos and exuding a sense of tension... more from happy excitement than from stress or agitation." The second strain derives uplift from the repeated motif of a three-note rising scale, and it ends with a complete ascending chromatic scale (see illustration). The C strain is "a quiet and sonorous trio in G-flat," while the D strain returns to the three-note rising scale motif, with almost every note in the whole strain accented.  Conductor Frederick Fennell describes the D theme as:
some of the most wide-open, free-swinging band music I know. Sousa's use of the trombones to intone the first three notes only and then other fragments of the melody while the rest of the tune keepers carry on with the melody makes all the difference.
The use of trombones to emphasize selected elements of melody, as mentioned by Fennell, is characteristic of Sousa's scoring throughout his career.  But in certain other respects, the instrumentation of High School Cadets displays its place in the evolution of the composer's ideas about scoring. This march makes use of alto and bass clarinets, and also of alto, tenor and baritone saxophonesall instruments seldom used in Sousa's early works but common in his post-1890 compositions. But the upper brass section consists only of B cornets; the score does not call for either E cornets (used in Sousa's early marches) nor for trumpets (which Sousa began to use after about 1895). High School Cadets is also unusual in having parts for both euphonium and baritone horn; most Sousa compositions include a single part that can be played by either instrument.  The fact that the score includes parts for tympani and orchestral bells suggests that Sousa conceived High School Cadets not simply as a piece for marching band, but for concert band as well.

Arrangements
The original edition of High School Cadets, as published in 1890 by Harry Coleman, included arrangements for band and also for:
piano solo
piano & mandolin
piano & banjo
mandolin & guitar
guitar solo
zither solo
banjo solo

It has also been arranged for:
 accordion (George H. Farnell, 1934)
 accordion (Lloyd Marvin, 1945)
 brass quartet (John Jay Hilfiger, 2010)
 flute solo (www.flutetunes.com)

Modern band arrangements include:
 a historically researched arrangement by Frank Byrne (Wingert-Jones Publications, 1998)
 a concert band arrangement by John Pasternak (JM Publishing, 2014)
 a simplified arrangement by Ralph Ford for beginning band (Belwin Mills Publishing)
 a simplified arrangement by Andrew Balent for intermediate band (Carl Fisher, 2014)

Recordings
Sousa had a poor opinion of recorded music, considering that it would reduce the incentive to play live music and fearing its implications for the intellectual property rights of composers and musicians. However, he recognized the growing public interest in recordings, and despite his personal reservations he allowed his works to be recorded by numerous ensembles including his own band, although he generally declined to attend the recording sessions and designated others to serve as bandleaders for these occasions.  High School Cadets proved popular with recording orchestras and bands, both in Sousa's era and in modern times.

Historic recordings
recording by Sousa's Grand Concert Band (circa 1899) Columbia Phonograph Co.  brown wax cylinder
recording by Columbia Band (1902) Columbia Phonograph Co.  7 inch disc, 74 rpm
recording by Edison Military Band (1907) Edison Gold Molded Cylinder
recording by Prince's Band (early 1900s) Victor
recording by Victor Military Band (1911) Victor 35208 12 inch disc, 78 rpm
recording by Conway's Band (1921) Edison Blue Amberol cylinder #4316 (also issued as disc #7296)
recording by Sousa's Band, Nathaniel Shilkret conductor (1923) Victor 19064 10 inch disc 78 rpm

Representative modern recordings
recording by Eastman Wind Ensemble, Frederick Fennell conductor, from album Sound Off! (1960) Mercury Records
recording by Cincinnati Pops Orchestra, Erich Kunzel conductor, from album Peaches and Cream (1984) Vox Cum Laude Records
recording by Boston Pops Orchestra, Arthur Fiedler conductor, from album Sousa Marches (1985) RCA Camden Records
recording by USAF Heritage of America Band, Lt.Col. Lowell E. Graham conductor, from album Sousa (1995) Klavier Records

References in popular culture
The final portion of the march (one apiece of the C and D strains) was used for the melody of "The March of the Penguins" in Gloria Jean's 1939 film, The Under-Pup. (see External links)

Gloria Jean also sang the tune as a solo in the follow-up film, A Little Bit of Heaven.

Themes from High School Cadets and from Sousa's The Thunderer form the basis of an arrangement by Robert W. Smith & Michael Story entitled "Sousa Times Twosa".

High School Cadets is a popular selection in competitions for school marching bands. (see External links)

See also 
 List of marches by John Philip Sousa

Notes

References

External links
Music, background and scenes from "The Under-pup"
Gloria Jean excerpt
A school concert band performing the march
Another school concert band
A high school marching band
Another marching band
A professional rendition
A self-playing Wurlitzer performs Sousa's "High School Cadet" March
Performance by the United States Marine Band, Miclael J. Colburn, conductor

1890 compositions
Sousa marches
American military marches
Concert band pieces
Compositions by John Philip Sousa